.pw is the country code top-level domain for the Republic of Palau.

History
The country code top-level domain .pw was delegated to the Pacific island nation of Palau in 1997. It has since been redelegated a number of times. Directi, a group of technology businesses, obtained exclusive rights over .pw from EnCirca in 2004. From March 25, 2013, domains under the .pw TLD are available to the general public. Since then, it is sometimes marketed as a domain for professionals (professional web).

A few months after opening the registry to the general public, .pw became the target of spammers. 
Symantec released two reports in April and May 2013 claiming that domains under .pw TLD were a significant source of spam e-mail. Directi responded that it had zero tolerance for spam and would be deleting domains accused of violating its anti-abuse policy.

In July 2013 the registry announced that they had passed the 250,000 registration milestone within the first three months, after having 50,000 registered domains in the first three weeks.

See also

 Internet in Palau

References

External links 
 
 IANA Delegation Record for .pw

Communications in Palau
Country code top-level domains
Endurance International Group

sv:Toppdomän#P